The highest-selling albums in Japan are ranked in the weekly Oricon Albums Chart, which is published by Oricon Style magazine. The data is compiled by Oricon based on each albums' weekly physical sales. This list includes the albums that reached the number one place on that chart in 2015.

Chart history

References

See also
2015 in Japanese music

Number-one albums
Japan
2015